Aranimokw is a former Karok settlement in Humboldt County, California. It was located near Red Cap Creek, a tributary which enters the Klamath River south of Orleans; the precise location of the village is unknown.

References

Former settlements in Humboldt County, California
Former Native American populated places in California
Lost Native American populated places in the United States
Karuk villages